Parusta is a genus of moths in the family Saturniidae first described by Rothschild in 1907.

Species
Parusta thelxinoe Fawcett, 1915
Parusta xanthops Rothschild, 1907

References

Saturniinae